Rawnsley Bluff (formerly Rawnsley's Bluff) is a geological feature in the Australian state of South Australia located in the locality of Flinders Ranges, South Australia and within the boundaries of the Ikara-Flinders Ranges National Park.

It is a bluff that is part of Wilpena Pound, and it is south of St Mary Peak (St Mary Peak is the tallest in the Flinders Ranges at ). Rawnsley's Bluff connects the eastern and western mountain ranges of the pound.

The Adelaide Scotch College Cadet Unit used the bluff for training each year until the unit was disbanded in the early 1970s. Training included flights with helicopters, infantry training, and practice with infantry weapons such as mortars. The unit was noted for providing outdoor adventures to the student body.

In the 1890s Rawnsley's Bluff was home to a trigonometrical station, supporting surveying in South Australia.

References

External links
Rawnsley's Bluff 
Rawnsley's Bluff (green grass)
pics and map

Cliffs of Australia
Flinders Ranges
Far North (South Australia)